Maligawila, or Maligavila is a village in Sri Lanka, approximately  south from Monaragala and  from Okkampitiya in the Monaragala District. This Buddha draws many tourists to the region. It also boasts the Avalokitesvara statue, a  limestone portrait. These statues, which were discovered in the 1950s and restored between 1989 and 1991, are believed to have been commissioned by the 7th-century prince Agghabodhi. There is additionally a 10th-century historical pillar placed in the 10th year of the rule of Mahinda IV (956-972 AD).

Gallery

References

Populated places in Uva Province
Tourist attractions in Monaragala District
Archaeological protected monuments in Monaragala District